Ali Gorzan, also rendered as Ali Kordan or Ali Gordan or Ali Korzan or Ali Khurdan, may refer to:
 Ali Gorzan-e Olya
 Ali Gorzan-e Sofla